Phil is a 2019 Canadian comedy-drama film directed by Greg Kinnear and starring Kinnear, Emily Mortimer, Jay Duplass, Robert Forster, Taylor Schilling, Kurt Fuller, Luke Wilson and Bradley Whitford.  It is Kinnear's directorial debut.

Cast
Greg Kinnear as Phil
Emily Mortimer as Alicia
Bradley Whitford as Michael Fisk
Luke Wilson as Detective Welling
Jay Duplass as Malcolm
Robert Forster as Bing Fisk
Megan Charpentier as Molly
April Cameron as Rahel
Taylor Schilling as Samantha Ford
Kurt Fuller as Dean Wurtz
Sarah Dugdale as Kara
Isaiah Lehtinen as Teen #1

Release

Reception
Jeffrey M. Anderson of Common Sense Media awarded the film two stars out of five. Lorry Kikta of Film Threat awarded it eight stars out of ten. Nick Allen of RogerEbert.com gave the film one and a half stars. David Ehrlich of IndieWire graded the film a C−.

References

External links
 

2019 films
2019 comedy-drama films
2019 directorial debut films
2010s English-language films
Canadian comedy-drama films
English-language Canadian films
Films scored by Rolfe Kent
Quiver Distribution films
2010s Canadian films